Claudia Pía Baudracco (22 October 1970 – 18 March 2012) was an Argentine activist for the rights of women, sexual minorities, and LGBT people.

Biography
Baudracco was born on 22 October 1970 in La Carlota, Córdoba Province. She spent her adolescence with her family in Venado Tuerto, and then moved to Buenos Aires.

Due to her gender identity, she suffered harassment and mistreatment and had to go into exile for several years, first in Uruguay and then in Europe.

Activism
Later the organization would be called the Argentine Cross-dresser Transsexual Transgender Association (Asociación Travestis Transexuales Transgéneros Argentinas; ATTTA). With the support of this organization, she would lead the movement for the repeal of the Códigos de Faltas in 15 provinces; these codes criminalized trans identities. The result was their repeal in several provinces.

Baudracco actively campaigned for approval of the Gender Identity Law, which gave trans people the right to have their name of choice and access to healthcare.

In 2008, she conducted several prevention and research activities as a member of the Country Coordinating Mechanism of The Global Fund to Fight AIDS, Tuberculosis and Malaria, work she carried out with the Ministry of Health's Directorate of AIDS and Sexually Transmitted Diseases.

Claudia Pía Baudracco died at her home in Buenos Aires on 18 March 2012. She had gone without medical checkups for much of her life, and had been unable to take advantage of the healthcare provisions of the Gender Identity Law, as it was enacted shortly after her death.

Day of the Promotion of the Rights of Trans People

In tribute to Claudia Pía Baudracco, the Buenos Aires City Legislature passed a law on 13 June 2013, designating 18 March as "Day of the Promotion of the Rights of Trans People". This was enacted on 15 July.

Documentary
In 2015, the documentary film Si te viera tu madre… Huellas de una leona (in English: If your mother could see you: Footprints of a lioness), directed by Andrés Rubiño and co-produced by Patricia Rasmussen of ATTA, was presented at the Buenos Aires Legislature's Salón Raúl Alfonsín.

Recognitions
With the aim of establishing lines of discussion, intervention in public policies, and research on sexual diversity in Argentina and Latin America, FLACSO Argentina, the Undersecretariat of Sexual Diversity Policies of Santa Fe Province, and FALGBT created the Claudia Pía Baudracco scholarships for doctoral studies in social sciences.

This is a project conceived by Baudracco and María Belén Correa, gathering materials such as photos, videos, and newspaper clippings to reconstruct an Argentine trans remembrance. In 2014, it organized a piece titled La construcción de una Líder at the FALGBT's headquarters, with photos, letters, and objects of Baudracco.

In 2013, the Claudia Pía Baudracco textile cooperative was formed in Mar del Plata, led by 14 trans women in the area, intended as an alternative to sex work.

In 2017, the Claudia Pía Baudracco Inclusive Health Center, Chubut Province's first such facility, was inaugurated in Comodoro Rivadavia.

See also
 Mariana Casas
 María Rachid
 Diana Sacayán
 Transgender rights in Argentina

References

1970 births
2012 deaths
Argentine women's rights activists
HIV/AIDS activists
Argentine LGBT people
Argentine LGBT rights activists
People from Córdoba Province, Argentina
Transfeminists
Women civil rights activists
21st-century Argentine LGBT people